John Peter Cleaver Shanks (June 17, 1826 – January 23, 1901) was a U.S. Representative from Indiana from 1867 to 1875 and an officer in the Union Army during the American Civil War.

Biography
Born in Martinsburg, Virginia (now West Virginia), Shanks pursued an academic course. He studied law and was admitted to the bar in 1848 and commenced practice in Portland, Indiana, in 1849. He served as prosecuting attorney of Jay County in 1850 and 1851 and served as member of the State house of representatives in 1855.

Shanks was elected as a Republican to the Thirty-seventh Congress (March 4, 1861 – March 3, 1863). He was an unsuccessful candidate for reelection in 1862 to the Thirty-eighth Congress.

During the Civil War he served in the Union Army as a colonel and aide-de-camp to Major General John C. Fremont from September 20, 1861 to June 1862. He was appointed a colonel in the regular army and aide-de-camp from March 31, 1862 to October 9, 1863. He commanded the 7th Indiana Cavalry Regiment as colonel from October 9, 1863 to December 8, 1864. On December 12, 1864, President of the United States Abraham Lincoln nominated Shanks for appointment to the grade of brevet brigadier general of volunteers, to rank from December 8, 1864, and the United States Senate confirmed the appointment on February 14, 1865. He then commanded Brigade 1 of the Cavalry Division of the Department of Mississippi from December 8, 1864 to September 19, 1865, when he was mustered out of the volunteers.

On December 3, 1867, President Andrew Johnson nominated Shanks for appointment to the grade of brevet major general of volunteers, to rank from March 13, 1865, and the United States Senate confirmed the appointment on February 14, 1868.

Shanks was elected to the Fortieth and to the three succeeding Congresses (March 4, 1867 – March 3, 1875) and served as chairman of the Committee on Militia (Forty-first Congress) and the Committee on Indian Affairs (Forty-second Congress).

Shanks was an unsuccessful candidate for renomination in 1874. He resumed the practice of his profession. He was again a member of the State house of representatives in 1879.

Shanks died in Portland, Indiana, January 23, 1901 and was interred in Green Park Cemetery.

See also

 List of American Civil War brevet generals (Union)

Notes

References
 Eicher, John H., and David J. Eicher, Civil War High Commands. Stanford: Stanford University Press, 2001. .
  Retrieved on 2008-11-05

External links
 

1826 births
1901 deaths
Indiana lawyers
American prosecutors
Union Army colonels
People of Indiana in the American Civil War
People from Porter County, Indiana
Politicians from Martinsburg, West Virginia
Military personnel from Martinsburg, West Virginia
People from Portland, Indiana
19th-century American politicians
Republican Party members of the United States House of Representatives from Indiana